Girolamo Imparato (1550–1607) was an Italian painter working in a late-Renaissance or Mannerist style, active mainly in Naples. His father, the painter Francesco Imparato, was a colleague of Francesco Santafede.

References

1550 births
1607 deaths
16th-century Italian painters
Italian male painters
17th-century Italian painters
Painters from Naples
Italian Mannerist painters